The C. Blythe Andrews Jr. Public Library, formerly known as the College Hill Branch Library, is in Tampa, Florida. The 8,500 sq. foot facility  was renamed in 2011 for Florida Sentinel Bulletin owner and publisher C. Blythe Andrews. The library is located at 2607 E. Dr. MLK Jr. Blvd. It is part of the Tampa–Hillsborough County Public Library System (THPL), as well as a member of the Hillsborough County Public Library Cooperative (HCPLC).

The library offers books, audiobooks, music CDs, magazines, and DVDs, and internet access is available through computers and WiFi. There is a large community room and a small meeting room available for public usage. The full suite of Adobe Creative Cloud desktop apps is also available for members to use by booking ahead and on a walk-in basis.

History 
The library first opened to the public as the College Hill Public Library on June 16, 1989, in an 800 square foot double-wide trailer. The current building opened in 1994 and, in 2010, was renamed after C. Blythe Andrews Jr., a publisher of the Florida Sentinel Bulletin, a newspaper serving the African American community.

Future plans
At 8,500 square feet, the previous library building was considered too small for the number of customers the library was intaking.

The C. Blythe Andrews Jr. Public Library Closed on April 15, 2017, so that work could start on the construction of a new, larger library to better assist the needs of the community. Demolition of the old building has been completed and as of October 2017, Hillsborough County is awaiting a contract award for construction. The new C. Blythe Andrews Jr. Public Library is scheduled to open Winter 2018. The new library will feature larger meeting spaces, recording studio, computer lab, separate children's area, an African American Media Archive, and a Friends of the Library Bookstore.

Friends of the library 
The C. Blythe Andrews Jr. Public Library receives support from the Ada T. Payne Friends of the Urban Libraries. Their fundraising efforts support not only this branch, but also the Robert W. Saunders Sr. Public Library and the West Tampa Branch Library. The Ada. T Payne friends have bookstores in all three of these libraries.

Library art 
The library features two lithographs in the main reading room area: No Place Like Home, 1990 by artist Louis Delsarte and With Honors, 1989 by artist Synthia St. James. There are twenty-one Burgert Brothers' black-and-white photograph reproductions that are included in the library's art collection.

References

External links

 C. Blythe Andrews Jr. Public Library hillsboroughcounty.org Retrieved 2016-04-12 – Official website
 C. Blythe Andrews Jr. Public Library: Locations: Hillsborough County Public Library Cooperative www.hcplc.org Retrieved 2016-04-12
 C. Blythe Andrews Jr. Public Library Expansion/Replacement www.hillsboroughcounty.org Retrieved 2016-04-12

Public libraries in Florida